William Augustus Wellman  (February 29, 1896 – December 9, 1975) was an American film director, producer, screenwriter, actor and military pilot. He was known for his work in crime, adventure, and action genre films, often focusing on aviation themes, a particular passion. He also directed several well-regarded satirical comedies. His 1927 film, Wings, was the first film to win an Academy Award for Best Picture at the 1st Academy Awards ceremony.

Beginning his film career as an actor, he went on to direct over 80 films, at times co-credited as producer and consultant, from the silent era through the Golden Age of Hollywood. He was nominated for four Academy Awards: three Best Director Oscars for the original A Star Is Born (1937), Battleground (1949), and The High and the Mighty (1954) and one in Best Original Story for A Star is Born, which he won. In 1973, he received the Directors Guild of America's Lifetime Achievement Award. He was previously a decorated combat pilot during World War I, serving in the Lafayette Flying Corps of the French Air Force, and earning a Croix de Guerre with two palms for valorous action.

Early life
Wellman was born in Brookline, Massachusetts. His father, Arthur Gouverneur Wellman, was a Boston Brahmin. William was a five times great-grandson of Puritan Thomas Wellman, who emigrated to the Massachusetts Bay Colony circa 1640.  He was also a great-great-great-grandson of Welsh-born Francis Lewis of New York, one of the signatories to the Declaration of Independence. Wellman's mother, Cecilia McCarthy, was an Irish immigrant.  

During his teenage years, Wellman often found himself in trouble with authorities. He was expelled from Newton High School in Newtonville, Massachusetts for dropping a stink bomb on the principal's head. He was also arrested and placed on probation for car theft. His mother, who actually worked as a probation officer, was asked to address Congress on the subject of juvenile delinquency. Later, young William worked as a salesman, as a general laborer in a lumber yard, and as a player on a minor-league hockey team.

World War I

In World War I, Wellman enlisted in the Norton-Harjes Ambulance Corps to serve as a driver in Europe. While in Paris, Wellman joined the French Foreign Legion and was assigned on December 3, 1917 as a fighter pilot, becoming the first American to join Escadrille N.87 in the Lafayette Flying Corps (not the sub-unit Lafayette Escadrille as usually stated), where he earned himself the nickname "Wild Bill", and was awarded the Croix de Guerre with two palms. N.87, les Chats Noir (Black Cat Group) was stationed at Lunéville in the Alsace-Lorraine sector and was equipped with Nieuport 17 and later Nieuport 24 "pursuit" aircraft. Wellman's combat experience culminated in three recorded "kills", along with five probables, although he was ultimately shot down by German anti-aircraft fire on March 21, 1918. Wellman survived the crash but he walked with a pronounced limp for the rest of his life.

Wellman's air-combat credits include the following in 1918:
 January 19: a German "Rumpler" shot down in front of American lines in Lorraine by Wellman and Thomas Hitchcock. 
 January 20: a German "Rumpler" shot down near German airfield at Mamy, France; pilot killed/gunner escaped
 March 8: forced two observers to jump from an observation balloon (attack unsuccessful; balloon taken down)
 March 9: fired on a German "Rumpler" over Parroy; plane escaped, but rear gunner killed.
 March 9: shot down a German "Rumpler"; killed rear gunner; pilot killed by airman Ruamps. 
 March 9: shot down a German "Albatros"; pilot killed; plane fell into American lines
 March 17: shot down at least two +one[?] German patrol planes; not confirmed as fight took place over German lines.
 March 18: shot down a German "Rumpler;" not confirmed as fight took place over German lines.

Maréchal des logis (Sergeant) Wellman received a medical discharge from the Foreign Legion and returned to the United States a few weeks later. He spoke at War Savings Stamp rallies in his French uniform. In September 1918 his book about French flight school and his eventful four months at the front, Go Get 'Em! (written by Wellman with the help of Eliot Harlow Robinson), was published. He joined the United States Army Air Service, but was too late to fly for America in the war. Stationed at Rockwell Field in San Diego, he taught combat tactics to new pilots.

Film career
While in San Diego, Wellman flew to Hollywood for the weekends in his Spad fighter, using Douglas Fairbanks' polo field in Bel Air as a landing strip. Fairbanks was fascinated with the true-life adventures of "Wild Bill" and promised to recommend him for a job in the movie business; he was responsible for Wellman being cast in the juvenile lead of The Knickerbocker Buckaroo (1919). Wellman was hired for the role of a young officer in Evangeline (1919), but he was fired for slapping Miriam Cooper, the film's star and also the wife of the production’s director, Raoul Walsh.

Wellman hated being an actor, thinking it an "unmanly" profession, and was miserable watching himself on screen while learning the craft. He soon switched to working behind the camera, aiming to be a director, and progressed up the line as "a messenger boy, as an assistant cutter, an assistant property man, a property man, an assistant director, second unit director and eventually...director." His first assignment as an assistant director for Bernie Durning provided him with a work ethic that he adopted for future film work. One strict rule that Durning enforced was no fraternization with screen femme fatales, which almost immediately Wellman broke, leading to a confrontation and a thrashing from the director. Despite his transgression, both men became lifelong friends, and Wellman steadily progressed to more difficult first unit assignments.

Wellman made his uncredited directorial debut in 1920 at Fox with The Twins of Suffering Creek. The first films he was credited with directing were The Man Who Won and Second Hand Love, released on the same day in 1923. After directing a dozen low-budget 'horse opera' films, Wellman was hired by Paramount in 1927 to direct Wings, a major war drama dealing with fighter pilots during World War I that was highlighted by air combat and flight sequences. The film culminates with the epic Battle of Saint-Mihiel. In the 1st Academy Awards it was one of two films to win Best Picture (the other was Sunrise), although, due to tensions within the studio regarding time and budget overages, Wellman wasn't invited to the event.

Wellman's other films include The Public Enemy (1931), the first version of A Star Is Born (1937), Nothing Sacred (1937), Beau Geste (1939) starring Gary Cooper, Thunder Birds (1942), The Ox-Bow Incident (1943), Lady of Burlesque (1943), The Story of G.I. Joe (1945), The Iron Curtain (1948), Battleground (1949) and two films starring and co-produced by John Wayne, Island in the Sky (1953) and The High and the Mighty (1954).

While he was primarily a director, Wellman also produced 10 films, one of them uncredited, all of which he also directed. His last film was Lafayette Escadrille (1958), which he produced, directed, wrote the story for and narrated. He wrote the screenplay for two other films that he directed, and one film that he did not direct: 1936's The Last Gangster. Wellman wrote the story for A Star Is Born and (with Robert Carson) received the Academy Award for Best Story. Wellman is credited for the story in the remakes released in 1954, 1976, and 2018. Wellman's work was influenced by his good friend and fellow film director Howard Hawks, with whom he rode motorcycles together in a group called the Moraga Spit and Polish Club.  

Wellman reportedly worked fast, usually satisfied with a shot after one or two takes. Despite his reputation for not coddling his leading men and women, he coaxed Oscar-nominated performances from seven actors: Fredric March and Janet Gaynor (A Star Is Born), Brian Donlevy (Beau Geste), Robert Mitchum (The Story of G.I. Joe), James Whitmore (Battleground), and Jan Sterling and Claire Trevor (The High and Mighty). Regarding actors, Wellman in a 1952 interview stated, "Movie stardom isn't about acting ability, it's personality and temperament". He then added, "I once directed Clara Bow. She was mad and crazy but what a personality!"

Innovations
Wings led to several firsts in filmmaking including newly invented camera mounts that could be secured to plane fuselages and motor-driven cameras to shoot actors while flying as the cameramen ducked out of frame in their cockpits. Star Richard Arlen had some flying experience but co-star Buddy Rogers had to learn to fly for the film, as stunt pilots could not be used during close-up shots. Towers up to 100 feet were used to shoot low-flying planes and battle action on the ground.

During the filming of Beggars of Life, a silent film starring Wallace Beery, Richard Arlen and Louise Brooks, sound was added to Beery's introductory scene at the behest of Paramount Studio. Wellman reportedly hung a microphone from a broom so Beery could walk and talk within the scene, avoiding the static shot required for early sound shoots. During the filming of Chinatown Nights (1929), he sat under the camera on a dolly with the mic between his legs, essentially inventing a shotgun mic.

Awards
Wellman won a single Academy Award, for the story of A Star Is Born. He was nominated as best director three times: for A Star Is Born, Battleground and The High and Mighty, for which he was also nominated by the Directors Guild of America as best director. In 1973, the DGA honored him with a Lifetime Achievement Award. Copies of both Wings and The Story of G.I. Joe are preserved in the Academy Film Archive. Wellman also has a star on the Hollywood Walk of Fame, at 6125 Hollywood Blvd.

Personal life and death
Wellman revealed near the end of his life that he had married a French woman named Renee during his time in The Lafayette Flying Corps. She was killed in a bombing raid during the war. Later, between 1918 and 1934, he married four additional times in the United States:
 Helene Chadwick: married (1918-1923) separated after a month; later divorced
 Margery Chapin (daughter of Frederic Chapin): married (1925-1926); together for a short time; adopted Robert Emmett Tansey's daughter, Gloria.
 Marjorie Crawford: married (1930-1933) divorced
 Dorothy "Dottie" Coonan: married (March 20, 1934 – 1975); until his death; they had seven children - four daughters, three sons.

Dorothy starred in Wellman's 1933 film Wild Boys of The Road and had seven children with him, including actors Michael Wellman, William Wellman Jr., Maggie Wellman, and Cissy Wellman. His daughter Kathleen "Kitty" Wellman married actor James Franciscus, although they later divorced. His first daughter is Patty Wellman, and he had a third son, Tim Wellman.

William Wellman died of leukemia in 1975 at his Brentwood home in Los Angeles. He was cremated, and his ashes were scattered at sea. His widow Dorothy, at age 95, died on September 16, 2009 in Brentwood, California.

Career assessments
Decades after Wellman's death, William Jr. wrote two biographies about his father, The Man and His Wings: William A. Wellman and the Making of the First Best Picture (2006) and Wild Bill Wellman—Hollywood Rebel (2015). Fellow filmmakers have also examined Wellman's career. Richard Schickel in 1973 devoted an episode of his PBS series The Men Who Made the Movies to Wellman, and in 1996, Todd Robinson made the feature-length documentary Wild Bill: Hollywood Maverick.

Selected filmography

The Knickerbocker Buckaroo (1919) (Wellman's debut as an actor)
The Twins of Suffering Creek (1920) (first film as director—uncredited)
The Man Who Won (1923)
Second Hand Love (1923)
Big Dan (1923)
Cupid's Fireman (1923)
The Vagabond Trail (1924)
Not a Drum Was Heard (1924)
The Circus Cowboy (1924)
When Husbands Flirt (1925)
The Boob (1926)
You Never Know Women (1926)
The Cat's Pajamas (1926)
Wings (1927)
Ladies of the Mob (1928)
Beggars of Life (1928)
The Legion of the Condemned (1928)
Chinatown Nights (1929)
Woman Trap (1929)
The Man I Love (1929)
Young Eagles (1930)
Dangerous Paradise (1930)
Maybe It's Love (1930)
The Public Enemy (1931)
Other Men's Women (1931)
Night Nurse (1931)
The Star Witness (1931)
Safe in Hell (1931)
The Hatchet Man (1932)
So Big! (1932)
Frisco Jenny (1932)
The Purchase Price (1932)
Love Is a Racket (1932)
The Conquerors (1932)
Central Airport (1933)
Midnight Mary (1933)
Lilly Turner (1933)Heroes for Sale (1933)Wild Boys of the Road (1933)College Coach (1933)Viva Villa! (1934) (uncredited)The President Vanishes (1934)Stingaree (1934)Looking for Trouble (1934)The Call of the Wild (1935)The Robin Hood of El Dorado (1936)Small Town Girl (1936)Tarzan Escapes (1936) (uncredited)A Star Is Born (also Story) (1937)Nothing Sacred (1937)Men with Wings (1938)Beau Geste (1939)The Light that Failed (1939)Thunder Birds (1942)Roxie Hart (1942)The Great Man's Lady (1942)Lady of Burlesque (1943)The Ox-Bow Incident (1943)Buffalo Bill (1944)This Man's Navy (1945)The Story of G.I. Joe (1945)Gallant Journey (1946)Magic Town (1947)The Iron Curtain (1948)Yellow Sky (1948)Battleground (1949)The Happy Years (1950)The Next Voice You Hear... (1950)Across the Wide Missouri (1951)Westward the Women (1951)My Man and I (1952)Island in the Sky (Director + Narrator (Uncredited)) (1953)The High and the Mighty (1954)Track of the Cat (1954)Ring of Fear (uncredited) (1954)Blood Alley (1955)Good-bye, My Lady (1956)Darby's Rangers (1958)Lafayette Escadrille (1958)

See also

List of ambulance drivers during World War I

References
Bibliography

 William A. Wellman, Go, Get 'Em!: The True Adventures of an American Aviator of the Lafayette Flying Corps [etc.]. Boston: The Page Company, 1918
 William A. Wellman, A Short Time for Insanity: An Autobiography. New York: Hawthorn Books, 1974. 
 William A. Wellman, Growing Old Disgracefully. 2nd, unpublished volume of memoirs completed shortly before his death; copies were privately printed and distributed to his wife and each of their children
 William R. Meyer, Warner Brothers Directors: The Hard-Boiled, the Comic, and the Weepers. New Rochelle, NY: Arlington House Publishers, 1978, pp. 327–355. 
 Frank T. Thompson, William A. Wellman (Filmmakers series, no. 4). Metuchen, NJ: The Scarecrow Press, 1983. 
 Wheeler Winston Dixon, "Wellman, William Augustus". John A. Garraty, Mark C. Carnes (gen. eds.), American National Biography, Volume 23. New York: Oxford University Press, 1999, pp. 12–14. 
 William Wellman Jr., The Man and His Wings: William A. Wellman and the Making of the First Best Picture. Westport, CT: Praeger Publishers, 2006. 
 William Wellman Jr., Wild Bill Wellman: Hollywood Rebel. New York: Pantheon Books, 2015. 
 Leonard Maltin, "On Director William Wellman" [10-minute documentary short]. The High and the Mighty'' (Special Collector's Edition). DVD. Burbank, CA: Paramount Home Entertainment, 2005

Notes

External links

 
 
 
 
 "Go Get 'Em!", by William A. Wellman, Google ebook

1896 births
1975 deaths
20th-century screenwriters
American film directors
American people of Irish descent
American people of Welsh descent
American people of English descent
Best Story Academy Award winners
Deaths from cancer in California
Deaths from leukemia
French World War I pilots
Shot-down aviators
Soldiers of the French Foreign Legion
Western (genre) film directors
French military personnel of World War I
American military personnel of World War I